Bolbeno (Bolbén or Balbén in local dialect) was a comune (municipality) in Trentino in the northern Italian region Trentino-Alto Adige/Südtirol, located about  west of Trento.

Cities and towns in Trentino-Alto Adige/Südtirol